Michel Bignon (2 January 1891 – 18 September 1926) was a French equestrian. He competed in two events at the 1924 Summer Olympics.

References

External links
 

1891 births
1926 deaths
French male equestrians
Olympic equestrians of France
Equestrians at the 1924 Summer Olympics
Sportspeople from Biarritz